Lona Andre (born Launa Anderson;  March 2, 1915 – September 18, 1992) was an American film actress, golfer, and businesswoman.

Biography
Born in Nashville, Tennessee, Andre attracted attention with her first films in Hollywood and was named as one of the WAMPAS Baby Stars of 1932.

After a strong finish in the Paramount Panther Woman Contest – won by Kathleen Burke – she was signed to a movie contract by Paramount Pictures. When Paramount did not renew her option, Andre worked as a freelance artist.
During the 1930s she appeared frequently in films, usually as the lead in "B" pictures, and by the end of the decade had starred in more than fifty films.

In 1934, she was part of the cast of School For Girls along with Toby Wing, Lois Wilson, Sidney Fox, and Dorothy Lee. In 1936 she appeared alongside Laurel and Hardy in their feature film Our Relations.

Marriages
In June 1935, Andre eloped to Santa Barbara, California to marry MGM actor Edward Norris, then filed for an annulment action four days after her marriage in Tijuana, Mexico. When she worked with Buster Keaton for Educational Pictures in the mid-1930s, she enjoyed his company and they were often seen nightclubbing.

In October 1942, she married Richard E. Patton.

She was later married to salesman, James T. Bolling, and was divorced from him in March 1947. (An Associated Press story dated May 23, 1947, reported that a judge granted the divorce "yesterday", which would have been May 22, 1947.)

Golf
In 1938,  Andre set a then world golfing record for women by shooting 156 holes of golf in 11 hours and 56 minutes on the Lake Norconian, California course. Her best round was 91 for 18 holes and her worst was 115.

Post-acting career

Her acting career greatly diminished during the 1940s, and she made her last film appearance in 1943, in the Hal Roach featurette Taxi, Mister. After her film career ended she became a successful real estate broker and never returned to acting.

Filmography

References

Los Angeles Times, "Change Of Mind Balks Marriage", November 2, 1933, Page 17.
Los Angeles Times, "Musical Picture Tops Program On Pantages Screen", October 18, 1934, Page 19.
Los Angeles Times, "Daughter Trio Elope; Cupid Snares Mother", June 7, 1935, Page A1.
Los Angeles Times, "Lona Andre's Marriage Ends With Annulment", October 19, 1935, Page A3.
Ogden, Utah Standard-Examiner, "Going Hollywood", October 28, 1938, Page 9.
Syracuse Herald-Journal, "Big Phone Bill Wins Divorce", March 23, 1947, Page 104.

External links

Gallery of Lona Andre Pictures

American film actresses
Actresses from Nashville, Tennessee
1915 births
1992 deaths
Burials at Forest Lawn Memorial Park (Glendale)
20th-century American actresses
WAMPAS Baby Stars